Kabataş is an underground station and eastern terminus of the F1 funicular line and will be the eastern terminus of the M7 metro line of the Istanbul Metro . The station is located under Meclis-i Mebusan Avenue in northeastern Beyoğlu. Connections to the T1 tram line, ferry service and city bus service are available on the surface.

Kabataş station was opened on 29 June 2006, 28 days after the T1 tram line was extended north from Eminönü to Kabataş. The station has become an important transfer point between ferry and rapid transit.

Layout

References

External links
Metro Istanbul - official site

Rail transport in Istanbul
Railway stations in Istanbul Province
Beyoğlu
Funicular railways in Turkey
2006 establishments in Turkey
Rapid transit stations under construction in Turkey